Kärde is a village in Jõgeva Parish, Jõgeva County in eastern Estonia.

Kärde Manor was the location where the Treaty of Cardis between Tsardom of Russia and Swedish Empire in 1661 after the Russo-Swedish War was signed.

References

Villages in Jõgeva County
Kreis Dorpat